V discography may refer to:

 Discography of V of the South Korean boy group BTS
 Discography of the British boyband V

See also
 Discography of the hip hop duo V & Legacy